The Armed Forces of the Czech Republic are the military forces of the Czech Republic. They consist of the Army of the Czech Republic, the Military Office of the President of the Republic and the Castle Guard, as defined by the Act No. 219/1999, on the Armed Forces of the Czech Republic. The current supreme commander of the Armed Forces of the Czech Republic is President of the Republic Miloš Zeman.

The term Armed Forces of the Czech Republic is defined by law. However, in several Czech military documents it is also used for the actual Army of the Czech Republic. For example, 2004 Doctrine of the Armed Forces of the Czech Republic is called Doktrína Armády České republiky in Czech (i.e., Doctrine of the Army of the Czech Republic). Moreover, in 2011 White Paper on Defence the term armed forces is understood differently from its definition in Act No. 219/1999 and includes Land, Air, Special and Support Forces, Military Police, Military Intelligence, Military Office of the Czech President and Castle Guard. On the other hand, 2015 Security Strategy of the Czech Republic states that "the armed forces, with the Army of the Czech Republic at their core, play a key role in supporting the implementation of the defence policy."

References

External links
 Ministry of Defence & Armed Forces of the Czech Republic

Military of the Czech Republic